Pseudocatharylla mariposella is a moth in the family Crambidae. It was described by Stanisław Błeszyński in 1964. It is found in the Democratic Republic of the Congo and Zambia.

References

Crambinae
Moths described in 1964